The 1923 Louisiana Tech Bulldogs football team was an American football team that represented the Louisiana Polytechnic Institute—now known as Louisiana Tech University—as a member of the Louisiana Intercollegiate Athletic Association (LIAA) during the 1923 college football season. Led by William Henry Dietz in his second and final year as head coach, Louisiana Tech compiled an overall record of 6–2. The team's captain was Roe Hollis.

Schedule

References

Louisiana Tech
Louisiana Tech Bulldogs football seasons
Louisiana Tech Bulldogs football